Anal may refer to:

Related to the anus
Related to the anus of animals:
 Anal fin, in fish anatomy
 Anal vein, in insect anatomy
 Anal scale, in reptile anatomy
Related to the human anus:
 Anal sex, a type of sexual activity involving stimulation of the anus
 Anal stage, a term used by Sigmund Freud to describe the development during the second year of life
 Anal expulsive, people who have a carefree attitude
 Anal retentive, a person overly uptight or distressed over ordinarily minor problems

Places
 Anal Island, an island of the Marshall Islands
 Añal, New Mexico, a ghost town

Other uses
 Anāl people, an ethnic group of northeast India and Myanmar
Anāl language, the Sino-Tibetan language they speak
 Ammonal, or ANAL, an explosive made from ammonium nitrate (AN) and aluminium (AL) powder
 All Nippon Air Line, a 2008 boys love manga
 Anal Arasu, Indian fight master/action choreographer

See also

 IANAL, a colloquial acronym for "I am not a lawyer"
 Annal
 Annales (disambiguation)
 Annual (disambiguation)
 Antal (disambiguation)

Language and nationality disambiguation pages